Aluf (Major General, res.) Amos Yadlin (born 20 November 1951) is a former general in the Israeli Air Force (IAF), Israel Defense Forces military attaché to Washington, D.C. and head of the IDF Military Intelligence Directorate (Aman).

Biography
Amos Yadlin was born in Kibbutz Hatzerim, the son of Edah and Aharon Yadlin. In 1970, he enlisted in the IAF. Yadlin obtained a B.A. in Economics and Business Administration at Ben-Gurion University of the Negev. He received a master's degree in public administration from the Harvard Kennedy School, Harvard University.

Military career
After qualifying as a fighter pilot, Yadlin joined the 102 "Flying Tiger" Squadron, with which he flew the A-4 Skyhawk during the Yom Kippur War. In the early 1980s Yadlin was among the first batch of Israeli pilots to fly the F-16 Fighting Falcon and was among the eight pilots selected to carry out Operation Opera against Iraq's Osirak nuclear reactor in June 1981. A year later, Yadlin participated in Operation Peace for Galilee. In all he had accumulated about 5,000 flight hours and flew more than 250 combat missions. Yadlin commanded two fighter squadrons (116 and 106), two Israeli Air Force bases (Nevatim and Hatzerim) and between 1990 and 1993 headed the IAF's planning department. He then served as Deputy Commander of the IAF.

In February 2002 Yadlin was awarded the rank of major general and appointed commander of the IDF Military Colleges and National Defense College. Between 2004 and 2006 he served as Israel's military attaché to the United States. Upon his return to Israel, Yadlin was named head of Aman, the IDF's Military Intelligence Directorate.

Post-retirement
After his retirement from the IDF in November 2010, Yadlin joined the Washington Institute for Near East Policy as the Kay Fellow on Israeli national security. In November 2011, he was appointed director of Tel Aviv University's Institute for National Security Studies.

Yadlin's public positions have urged caution and patience in dealing with the nuclear program of Iran, in contrast to the more urgent language of Prime Minister Benjamin Netanyahu. He tentatively supported the Geneva interim agreement of November 2013.

Yadlin advocates, if peace negotiations with the Palestinians fail to produce an agreement, unilaterally withdrawing from 85% of the West Bank. The IDF would maintain a presence in the Jordan Rift Valley and in the main settlement blocs, as well as a strip of land meant to protect Ben Gurion Airport from Palestinian rocket attacks.

In January 2015, he joined the Zionist Union list for the elections for the twentieth Knesset, as its candidate for Ministry of Defense.

Published works

 Four strategic threats on Israel’s radar | a special briefing by former IDF intelligence head Amos Yadlin

References

External links

Living people
1951 births
Israeli aviators
Israeli generals
Israeli Air Force personnel
Israeli Jews
Yom Kippur War pilots
Harvard Kennedy School alumni
Ben-Gurion University of the Negev alumni
Israeli Labor Party politicians
Israeli expatriates in the United States
Directors of the Military Intelligence Directorate (Israel)
Institute for National Security Studies (Israel)